Clan Stewart (Gaelic: Stiùbhart) is a Scottish Highland and Lowland clan. The clan is recognised by Court of the Lord Lyon; however, it does not have a Clan Chief recognised by the Lord Lyon King of Arms. Because the clan has no chief it can be considered an armigerous clan; however, the Earls of Galloway are now considered to be the principal branch of this clan, and the crest and motto of The Earls of Galloway's arms are used in the Clan Stewart crest badge. The Court of the Lord Lyon recognises two other Stewart/Stuart clans, Clan Stuart of Bute and Clan Stewart of Appin. Clan Stuart of Bute is the only one of the three clans at present which has a recognised chief.

History

Origins of the Clan
The Stewarts who became monarchs of Scotland were descended from a family who were seneschals (stewards) of Dol in Brittany, France. After the Norman conquest of England, the Stewarts acquired estates in England as the FitzAlan family, also Earls of Arundel. Walter Flaad or Walter fitz Alan the steward came to Scotland when David I of Scotland claimed his throne. It is from their office as stewards that the surname Stewart came. Walter was created High Steward of Scotland and was granted large estates in Renfrewshire and East Lothian. Walter was one of the commanders of the royal army which defeated Somerled of the Isles (ancestor of Clan Donald) at the Battle of Renfrew in 1164. (See: Walter fitz Alan).

Scottish-Norwegian War

Alexander Stewart, 4th High Steward of Scotland, also known as Alexander of Dundonald Castle, commanded the Scottish army at the Battle of Largs in 1263 against Viking invaders.

Wars of Scottish Independence
During the Wars of Scottish Independence, James Stewart, 5th High Steward of Scotland swore fealty to Edward I of England. However, he later sided with Robert the Bruce and William Wallace in the struggle for Scottish independence.

Royal House of Stewart

Walter Stewart, 6th High Steward of Scotland married Marjory, daughter of king Robert the Bruce. When Robert's son, David II of Scotland died, he was succeeded by Walter Stewart's son, Robert II of Scotland. King Robert II had many sons; the eldest, John, succeeded to the throne of Scotland as Robert III of Scotland. The royal line of male Stewarts was uninterrupted until the reign of Mary, Queen of Scots. As a family the Stewarts (Stuarts) held the throne of Scotland and later England until the death of Anne, Queen of Great Britain in 1714.

Albany Stewarts

The Dukedom of Albany is a peerage title that was bestowed on some younger sons in the Scottish and later the British royal family, particularly in the House of Stuart. Robert II's third son was Robert Stewart, 1st Duke of Albany, who was Regent of Scotland during part of the reigns of his father, brother, and nephew James I of Scotland. Robert II's fourth son was Alexander Stewart, Earl of Buchan, who was famed as the Wolf of Badenoch and was responsible for the destruction of Elgin Cathedral.

When James I of Scotland came of age, he curbed the power of his cousins, the Albany Stewarts. He beheaded Murdoch Stewart, 2nd Duke of Albany, eldest son of the former regent Robert Stewart. Two of Murdoch's sons, Walter and Alexander (Alasdair), were both executed as well.

Main branches of the clan
As the Chief of the Stewarts was also the occupant of the throne, the relationship between the various branches or members of the family differed from the usual ties between clansmen and their Chief. The family did however have their own badge and tartan to distinguish them. Apart from the royal house of Stewart, the three main branches of the clan that settled in the Scottish Highlands during the 14th and 15th centuries were the Stewarts of Appin, Stewarts of Atholl and Stewarts of Balquhidder. Today the Earls of Galloway are considered the senior line of the Clan Stewart.

Stewarts of Appin

The Stewarts of Appin descend from Sir John Stewart of Bonkyll, son of Alexander Stewart, 4th High Steward of Scotland. Sir John's younger son, James Stewart, was killed in 1333 at the Battle of Halidon Hill. His grandson married the heiress of the Lord of Lorne (chief of Clan MacDougall). He was the first Stewart Lord of Lorne. The Stewarts of Appin supported the royalist cause during the Civil War of the 17th century and also supported the deposed Stuart monarchs during the Jacobite rising of 1715 and Jacobite rising of 1745.

Stewarts of Atholl
The Stewarts of Atholl are descended from a son of Alexander Stewart, Earl of Buchan, the "Wolf of Badenoch". James Stewart built a strong castle at Garth where he settled at the end of the 14th century. Queen Joanna, widow of James I of Scotland married the Black Knight of Lorne who was descended from the fourth High Steward. Their son was John Stewart of Balveny who was granted the Earldom of Atholl by his half-brother, James II of Scotland. He supported his brother, commanding the royal forces that opposed the rebellion by the Lord of the Isles. The fifth Stewart Earl of Atholl died with no male issue and his daughter married William Murray, second Earl of Tullibardine, who succeeded as Earl of Atholl. Many Stewarts continued to live in the Atholl area with many claiming descent from the Wolf of Badenoch. They were mainly transferred by allegiance to the Murray Earls of Atholl and were known as Athollmen. This is maintained today with the Atholl Highlanders, Europe's only legal private army. General David Stewart of Garth, an Athollman, was an officer in the Black Watch regiment and his book, Sketches of the Highlanders and Highland Regiments, popularized his homeland in Victorian England.

James Stewart of Sticks and Ballechin (d. 1523), illegitimate son of James II, King of Scotland, was the ancestor of several other Stewart families in Atholl, including the Stewarts of Arnagang, Ballechin, Innervack, Killichassie, the later Kynachins, Loch of Clunie, and Stewartfield.

Stewarts of Balquhidder

Stewarts came to Balqhidder in about 1490, when William Stewart, grandson of the only son of the Duke of Albany to escape the persecution of James I, was appointed ballie of the crown lands of Balquhidder.

Stuarts of Bute

The chiefs of the Clan Stuart of Bute are descended from Sir John Stewart, illegitimate son of Robert Stewart who reigned as Robert II of Scotland by Moira Leitch (according to tradition).

Earl Castle Stewart

Earl Castle Stewart, in the County Tyrone, is a title in the Peerage of Ireland. It was created in 1800 for Andrew Thomas Stewart, 9th Baron Castle Stuart.

The Earls Castle Stewart claim to be the head representatives in the pure male line of the Scottish Royal House of Stuart. They are directly descended from Sir Walter Stewart (died 1425), Keeper of Dumbarton Castle, younger son of Murdoch Stewart, 2nd Duke of Albany, son of Robert Stewart, 1st Duke of Albany, younger son of King Robert II of Scotland.

Castles
 

 Edinburgh Castle one of the most notable castles owned by the Stewarts as the royal family.
 Stirling Castle one of the most notable castles owned by the Stewarts as the royal family.
 Linlithgow Palace was one of the principal residences of the Stewart and Stuart monarchs of Scotland.
 Falkland Palace was acquired by the Stewart family in the 14th century and was owned by Robert Stewart, Duke of Albany. It was a royal palace of the Scottish kings.
 Castle Stuart was the home of the line of Stuarts who held the title Earl of Moray.
 Castle Stalker was a seat of the Stewarts of Appin.
 Lochranza Castle was granted to Walter Stewart, the Earl of Menteith in 1262 by Alexander III of Scotland.
 Dundonald Castle built in the 13th century by Alexander Stewart, 4th High Steward of Scotland. Used by the Stewart monarchs.
 Craigmillar Castle, Edinburgh, castle of the royal Stuarts.
 Doune Castle built in the 14th century by Robert Stewart, Duke of Albany.
 Earl's Palace, Kirkwall built by Robert Stewart, 1st Earl of Orkney.
 Bishop's Palace, Kirkwall originally a Norwegian fort, ownership later passed to Robert Stewart, 1st Earl of Orkney.
 Scalloway Castle built by Patrick Stewart, 2nd Earl of Orkney.
 Earl's Palace, Birsay built by Patrick Stewart, 2nd Earl of Orkney.
 Crookston Castle has been owned by various branches of the Clan Stewart.
 Rothesay Castle was built by the Stewarts at the beginning of the 13th century.
 Drumin Castle was the home of Alexander Stewart, Earl of Buchan (the Wolf of Badenoch).
 Ardvorlich Castle, stronghold of the Stuarts of Balquhidder
 Garth Castle, stronghold of the Clan Stewart.
 Grandtully Castle, stronghold of the Clan Stewart.
 Garlies Castle, stronghold of the Clan Stewart.
 Castle Campbell, originally called Castle Gloom, it passed by right of marriage to the Campbells who changed the name to Castle Campbell by an Act of Parliament in 1489.

Tartans

The usual tartan for the Stewarts or Stuarts is a red coloured pattern known as the Royal Stuart Tartan. According to historian Henry James Lee the effect of a large body of men crossing a hill in the red Stuart tartan, contrasting with the dark coloured heath has been described "as if the hill were on fire".

See also
 Scottish clan
 Armigerous clan
 High Steward of Scotland
 House of Stuart
 Marquess of Bute Crichton-Stuart of Bute
 Earl of Galloway Stewart of Galloway
 Earl of Moray Stuart of Moray
 Earl of Traquair Stewart of Traquair
 Earl of Wharncliffe
 Earl Castle Stewart Stewart in County Tyrone
 Viscount Stuart of Findhorn
 Lord Ochiltree
 Lord Avondale
 Lord Methven
 Lord Blantyre
 Baron Stuart de Decies
 Baron Stuart de Rothesay
 Baron Stuart of Wortley
 Duke of Albany
 Duke of Monmouth James Scott, eldest illegitimate son of Charles II, attainted
 Duke of Buccleuch and Duke of Queensberry Descendants of James Scott, the Duke of Monmouth
 Duke of Cleveland and Duke of Southampton Descendants of Charles FitzRoy, an illegitimate son of Charles II, extinct
 Duke of Grafton Descendants of Henry FitzRoy, an illegitimate son of Charles II
 Duke of St Albans Descendants of Charles Beauclerk, an illegitimate son of Charles II
 Duke of Richmond, Duke of Lennox and Duke of Gordon Descendants of Charles Lennox, an illegitimate son of Charles II
 Duke of Berwick Descendants of James FitzJames, the illegitimate son of James II, attainted, almost extinct
 Duke of Fitz-James Descendants of James FitzJames, the illegitimate son of James II, extinct

References

External links
 Stewart Society
 Clan Stewart Society in America, Incorporated
 The Stewart/Stuart Association of Nova Scotia
 Clan Stewart at ScotClans.com
 Stewarts of Campbeltown, Kintyre

 
Stuart
Clans and families
Scottish Lowlands